Samuel Dwight Gehman (December 7, 1903 – June 1, 1992) was a Goodyear physicist noted for development of a modulus-based measurement of rubber's glass transition temperature.

Personal 

Gehman was born on December 7, 1903.  He died in Akron, Ohio, on June 1, 1992.

Education 

In 1922, he was one of eight sophomores selected for honors at the University of Pennsylvania.  He completed his doctoral dissertation in 1929 on the topic Reflection of Soft X-rays.

Career 

Gehman was recruited to Goodyear by Ray P. Dinsmore. He managed physics research at Goodyear's research division and was renowned for developing the Gehman low-temperature twist test, which gave laboratories convenient and precise low-temperature stiffening measurements of rubber compounds.  He was an inventor of approximately 70 patents.

In 1972, Gehman was listed at 10th out of the 100 top contributors to the world's rubber literature published between 1932 and 1970.

Gehman retired in 1968 following 40 years with Goodyear Tire & Rubber Co.

Awards and recognitions
1965 - Fellow of the American Physical Society
 1970 - Charles Goodyear Medal from the ACS Rubber Division

External links
 Audio interview with Samuel D. Gehman

References 

Polymer scientists and engineers
1903 births
1992 deaths
Tire industry people
Goodyear Tire and Rubber Company people